Alvin Kent Nix (born March 12, 1944) is a former American football player who played professionally as a quarterback in the National Football League (NFL). He played college football at Texas Christian University (TCU). Nix is the son of Emery Nix, who played for the New York Giants in 1943 and 1946.

College career
Nix helped TCU to an upset of Baylor University in October 1964. He passed 4 yards to Joe Ball for the first score in a 17–14 win at Fort Worth, Texas. He led the Horned Frogs on four long scoring drives as a senior quarterback to defeat Baylor in Waco, Texas, the following October. Nix hit on five consecutive passes during a 79-yard drive for a touchdown, in the second quarter. TCU won on a field goal by Bruce Alford in the third period. Nix tied a Southwest Conference record with 4 touchdown passes of 31, 24, 12, and 15 yards, versus Rice University, in November 1965. He also scored on a one-yard plunge to give Texas Christian a 42-14 halftime lead. His first two touchdown passes came in the first ninety-three seconds following Rice fumbles. Nix was bothered for much of his collegiate career by a knee injury. While at TCU, he was a member of Delta Tau Delta fraternity.

Professional career

Green Bay Packers 
Nix was cut by the Green Bay Packers on August 2, 1966. He passed through waivers but was retained on the Packers' taxi squad for the remainder of the 1966 season. After clearing waivers Nix became a free agent.
Nix was back in the Packers' training camp in 1967, but trailed three other quarterbacks on the depth chart: Bart Starr, Zeke Bratkowski and Don Horn. On July 30, 1967, the Packers traded Nix to the Pittsburgh Steelers, in exchange for the Steelers' fifth round draft pick in 1968. This wound up being the 9th pick in the 5th round, and the Packers used it in the 1968 draft to select offensive lineman Steve Duich.

Pittsburgh Steelers 
Nix got his first chance to play in the NFL with the Pittsburgh Steelers in September 1967. The Steelers' regular quarterback, Bill Nelsen, had an injury to his right knee. Nix was the only other quarterback on the roster. He made his debut against the Philadelphia Eagles. Nix connected on an 18-yard pass to J.R. Wilburn to tie the score, 24–24, midway through the fourth quarter. The Steelers lost in Philadelphia, Pennsylvania, 34–24. Nix completed 23 of 34 passes against the Cleveland Browns for 218 yards and one touchdown, in October 1967. Split end Dick Compton caught ten of his passes. Nix hit rookie Steelers' running back, Don Shy, for a 27-yard touchdown in a loss to the Giants at Pittsburgh, on October 15.

Tom Landry called Nix the best rookie quarterback he had seen in
ten years. Nix guided the Steelers to a 24–14 triumph against the Detroit Lions on December 3. He handed off to Shy for two one-yard touchdowns to cap drives of 80 and 64 yards in the first and second quarters. He fooled the Lions' defense by passing often on first and second down. Most significantly Nix found swift J.R. Wilburn for a 67-yard touchdown with 1:49 remaining in the second quarter. He
led the Steelers on a 78-yard drive, completed by a Nix to John Hilton 3-yard touchdown pass, which gave Pittsburgh a temporary 10–9 lead against the Washington Redskins. During the drive at Pittsburgh on December 10, Wilburn caught four passes for fifty-five yards.

The Steelers traded Nix during the 1970 preseason to the Minnesota Vikings, but he failed to make their roster and signed with the Bears before the season started.

Chicago Bears 
Nix signed with the Chicago Bears and spent the 1970 season on the taxi squad.  He rallied the Bears in the fourth quarter for a second straight week, coming from behind to upset the Vikings, 20–17, in September 1971. He threw touchdown passes of 36 and 26 yards to Dick Gordon in Minneapolis. The latter pass found Gordon in the end zone with 1:42 remaining in the game. Bears starting quarterback, Jack Concannon, was knocked out of the game on a hit by Carl Eller.

Nix started his first game since 1968 in a 35–14 beating of the New Orleans Saints at Soldier Field. He threw touchdown passes of 25 and 35 yards to Bob Wallace and Gordon. Overall, he completed 14 of 24 passes for 242 yards.

The Bears waived Nix on September 13, 1972. In March 1974 Nix filed suit against the Bears, charging they had misdiagnosed a November 1971 hand injury as a sprained wrist. He asked for more than $10,000. Nix had continued playing following the preliminary diagnosis. In his lawsuit he claimed that the injury was aggravated. A later diagnosis stated that the injury was a rupture of both tendons of the index finger of the right hand.

Houston Oilers 
The Houston Oilers signed him to their taxi squad on September 21. Nix appeared in 12 games for the Oilers, two of them starts. Houston traded Nix along with Ron Billingsley to the New Orleans Saints for Dave Parks, Tom Stincic, and Edd Hargett in March 1973.

New Orleans Saints 
Nix found himself in a four-way competition for three quarterback slots with the Saints, vying for a job with Archie Manning, second year QB Bobby Scott, and former Jets and Oilers backup QB Bob Davis. The Saints' 1973 pre-season media guide listed Nix third on the quarterback depth chart, behind Manning and Scott but ahead of Davis. The other three quarterbacks all appeared for the Saints in the 1973 regular season, but Nix never did.

Personal life
Nix returned to TCU to finish his business degree, and went into business with his wife Susan, who also attended TCU. She was named "Miss TCU" during her senior year. They went on to own a dry cleaning business, which they later sold, and then went into the florist business. Now retired, he serves on the Colonial County Club Board of Directors, and continues to follow TCU football closely. Susan Nix died in November 2020 from COVID-19 related complications.

References

1944 births
Living people
American football quarterbacks
Chicago Bears players
Houston Oilers players
TCU Horned Frogs football players
Pittsburgh Steelers players
People from Corpus Christi, Texas
Players of American football from Texas